Life Is Good is the second and final album released by the American pop group LFO in 2001 under J Records. It reached #75 on the Billboard 200.

The album met limited success when compared to the group's 1999 self-titled release. The only compact disc single released was "Life Is Good", despite the fact that "Every Other Time" achieved more popularity and radio air time. The song "6 Minutes" was later covered by the American pop rock band Jonas Brothers on their 2006 release It's About Time.

Track listing

 "Suzie's Pillow" is a hidden track and begins with ten minutes and one second of silence.

Charts

References

2001 albums
J Records albums
LFO (American band) albums